Patrick Geraghty (February 4, 1843 - ?) was an American farmer and schoolteacher from Elkhart Lake, Wisconsin who spent a single one-year term as a member of the Wisconsin State Assembly from Sheboygan County.

Background 
Geraghty was born in Westport, County Mayo, Ireland on February 4, 1843. He moved with his parents to Canada, later to Vermont and in 1849 to Sheboygan Falls, Wisconsin, and finally from there to the town of Rhine in 1851, where they settled. He received a common and high school education, and became a farmer and schoolteacher.

Public office 
Geraghty was elected justice of the peace in 1866, and again in 1874; and was also clerk of his school district for three terms. He was elected to the second Sheboygan County Assembly district ( the Towns of Greenbush, Lyndon, Mitchell, Plymouth, Rhine and Russell) as a candidate of the Reform Party (a short-lived coalition of Democrats, reform and Liberal Republicans, and Grangers formed in 1873, which secured the election of a Governor of Wisconsin and a number of state legislators) in 1874, with 850 votes, to 781 for Republican N. C. Harmon, succeeding fellow Reformer Samuel D. Hubbard. He was assigned to the standing committee on education.

He was not a candidate for re-election in 1875, and was succeeded by Republican William Noll.

References 

1843 births
Schoolteachers from Wisconsin
Farmers from Wisconsin
Irish emigrants to the United States (before 1923)
Members of the Wisconsin State Assembly
Politicians from County Mayo
People from Sheboygan Falls, Wisconsin
Wisconsin Reformers (19th century)
19th-century American politicians
Year of death missing
People from Elkhart Lake, Wisconsin